This page lists the episodes of the 1995–99 television sitcom The Parent 'Hood. There is a total of 90 episodes in this series.

Series overview

Episodes

Season 1 (1995)

Season 2 (1995–96)

Season 3 (1996–97)

Season 4 (1997–98)

Season 5 (1999)

External links
 
 

Parent Hood